Mohamed Raouraoua (born 12 September 1947 in Casbah, Algiers, French Algeria) is the former president of the Algerian Football Federation and the vice-president of the Union of Arab Football Associations.

He was first elected as president of the Algerian Football Federation in 2001 until 2005. He stood again for election in 2009 and was elected unanimously.

On 23 February 2011, Raouraoua was elected onto FIFA's executive committee. He took one of two places with Jacques Anouma retaining his position.
Raouraoua replaced disgraced Nigerian official Amos Adamu, who FIFA suspended for seeking bribes during the 2018 and 2022 World Cup bidding contests.

References

Living people
1946 births
People from Casbah
21st-century Algerian people